Millard Kaufman (March 12, 1917 – March 14, 2009) was an American screenwriter and novelist. His works include the Academy Award-nominated Bad Day at Black Rock (1955). He was also one of the creators of Mr. Magoo.

Early life
Kaufman was born and raised in Baltimore and graduated from the Baltimore City College (high school). He eventually graduated from Johns Hopkins University after work as a merchant seaman. After that, he moved to New York City, taking a job as copyboy for the New York Daily News. At some point, he married Lorraine Paisley.

He enlisted in the Marines in 1942, served on Guadalcanal, landed at Guam with the 1st Marine Brigade (Provisional) where he wrote an article for the Marine Corps Gazette about the battle, then participated in the Okinawa with the 6th Marine Division.

Screenwriting
While serving in the Pacific, Kaufman had contracted malaria and dengue fever, and upon his return to the United States, felt he could no longer deal with the extremes of the New York City climate. He and his wife moved to California where he took up screenwriting. In 1949, Kaufman wrote the screenplay for the short film Ragtime Bear, which was the first appearance of Mr. Magoo. He followed this up in 1950 with another UPA film, Punchy de Leon, featuring The Fox and The Crow.

In 1950, Kaufman lent his name to screenwriter Dalton Trumbo, who had been blacklisted after investigation by the House Un-American Activities Committee, for the screenplay for Gun Crazy.

In 1953, he received an Academy Award nomination for his screenplay for Take the High Ground!. In 1955, he received another nomination for his screenplay for Bad Day at Black Rock. Although he usually worked as a writer, he also directed Convicts 4 (1962) and served as associate producer for Raintree County (1957).

McSweeney's published Kaufman's first fiction novel, titled Bowl of Cherries, in October 2007. Kaufman was 86 years old when he began work on the novel and 90 when it was published. His second novel, Misadventure, was published posthumously. He also published a screenwriting manual, Plots & Characters: A Screenwriter on Screenwriting.

Death
Kaufman died aged 92 in Los Angeles of heart failure after open heart surgery.

Work

Films
 The Big Blow (1948)
 Ragtime Bear (1949)
 Punchy de Leon (1950)
 Unknown World (1951)
 Aladdin and His Lamp (1952)
 Take the High Ground! (1953)
 Bad Day at Black Rock (1955)
 Raintree County (1957) (also associate producer)
 Never So Few (1959)
 Convicts 4 (1962) (also directed)
 The War Lord (1965)
 Living Free (1972)
 The Klansman (1974)

Television
 Police Story (1973)
 The Nativity (1978)
 Enola Gay: The Men, the Mission, the Atomic Bomb (1980)

Books
 Plots & Characters: A Screenwriter on Screenwriting (2001)
 Bowl of Cherries (2007) – paperback (2008) 
 Misadventure (2010)

Image
 Millard Kaufman at age 90

References

External links

 Rebecca Mead, "The Literary Life: First at Ninety", The New Yorker, September 17, 2007
 
 McSweeney's Internet Tendency: Bowl of Cherries: A Novel by Millard Kaufman.
 Grimes, William. "Millard Kaufman, 92, a Creator of Mr. Magoo, Dies," The New York Times, Thursday, March 19, 2009.
Interview with Kaufman http://www.jhu.edu/jhumag/0408web/kaufman.html

1917 births
2009 deaths
American male screenwriters
American television writers
United States Marine Corps personnel of World War II
American male television writers
Baltimore City College alumni
United States Marine Corps officers
Screenwriting instructors
20th-century American male writers
20th-century American screenwriters